
Gmina Działdowo is a rural gmina (administrative district) in Działdowo County, Warmian-Masurian Voivodeship, in northern Poland. Its seat is the town of Działdowo, although the town is not part of the territory of the gmina.

Villages
Gmina Działdowo contains the villages and settlements of Burkat, Bursz, Drzazgi, Filice, Gąsiorowo, Gnojenko, Gnojno, Grzybiny, Jankowice, Kisiny, Klęczkowo, Komorniki, Kramarzewo, Krasnołąka, Księży Dwór, Kurki, Lipówka, Malinowo, Mosznica, Myślęta, Niestoja, Petrykozy, Pierławki, Pożary, Prusinowo, Rudolfowo, Ruszkowo, Rywociny, Sękowo, Sławkowo, Turza Wielka, Uzdowo, Wilamowo, Wysoka and Zakrzewo.

Neighbouring gminas
Gmina Działdowo is bordered by the gminas of Dąbrówno, Iłowo-Osada, Kozłowo, Kuczbork-Osada, Lipowiec Kościelny, Płośnica and Rybno.

References

Polish official population figures 2006

Dzialdowo
Działdowo County